Get What You Deserve is the sixth studio album by German thrash metal band Sodom, released on 10 January 1994 via Steamhammer/SPV. This was the band's last album to feature guitarist Andy Brings, and their first release with drummer Guido "Atomic Steif" Richter as the replacement of founding member Christian "Witchhunter" Dudek. Get What You Deserve finds Sodom continuing their experimentation, although it bypasses the death metal sound of its predecessor Tapping the Vein in favor of a more crossover/hardcore punk-influenced approach.

Track listing

Personnel
Tom Angelripper - vocals, bass
Andy Brings - guitars
Atomic Steif - drums

Charts

References

1994 albums
Sodom (band) albums
SPV/Steamhammer albums